Shanghai is a 1935 film directed by James Flood, produced by Walter Wanger, distributed by Paramount Pictures, and starring Loretta Young and Charles Boyer. The picture's supporting cast features Warner Oland, Alison Skipworth, Charley Grapewin, Olive Tell and Keye Luke, and the running time is 75 minutes.

Cast
Loretta Young as  Barbara Howard 
Charles Boyer as  Dimitri Koslov 
Warner Oland as  Ambassador Lun Sing 
Alison Skipworth as  Aunt Jane 
Fred Keating as  Tommy Sherwood 
Charley Grapewin as  Truesdale 
Walter Kingsford as  Hilton 
Josephine Whittell as  Mrs. Truesdale 
Olive Tell as  Mrs. Hilton 
Libby Taylor as  Corona, Maid 
Keye Luke as  Chinese Ambassador's Son 
Willie Fung as  Wang (as Willy Fung) 
Boothe Howard as  Manager, Broker's Office 
Arnold Korff as  Van Hoeffer

Reception
The film made a profit of $142,246.

References

External links
Shanghai in the New York Times

Shanghai at Turner Classic Movies
Shanghai at Movie Art Archives

1935 films
1930s English-language films
American black-and-white films
1935 romantic drama films
1930s German-language films
Films directed by James Flood
American romantic drama films
Films produced by Walter Wanger
Films scored by Friedrich Hollaender
Paramount Pictures films
1930s American films